Minuscule 601 (in the Gregory-Aland numbering), α 360 (von Soden), is a Greek minuscule manuscript of the New Testament, on paper. Palaeographically it has been assigned to the 13th century. The manuscript is lacunose. Formerly it was labelled by 121a and 142p.

Description 

The codex contains the text of the Acts of the Apostles, Catholic epistles, Pauline epistles on 257 paper leaves (size ), with lacunae (Titus, Philemon, Hebrews 1:1-5:2). Texts of Acts 1:1-5:20; 10:23-35; 13:4-16; He 8:13-10:7 were added by a later hand.

The text is written in one column per page, 23-24 lines per page.

Text 

The Greek text of the codex is a representative of the Byzantine text-type. Aland placed it in Category V.

History 

The manuscript belonged to Jacques Auguste de Thou († 1617), his son François Auguste de Thou († 1642), then to Colbert.

The manuscript was added to the list of New Testament manuscripts by Johann Martin Augustin Scholz. It was examined and described by Paulin Martin. Gregory saw the manuscript in 1885.

The manuscript currently is housed at the Bibliothèque nationale de France (Gr. 104), at Paris.

See also 

 List of New Testament minuscules
 Biblical manuscript
 Textual criticism

References

Further reading 

 

Greek New Testament minuscules
13th-century biblical manuscripts
Bibliothèque nationale de France collections